Golda Schultz (born 1983 in Cape Town) is a South African operatic soprano.

Life

Origin and education 
Schultz, daughter of a mathematics professor, grew up in Bloemfontein. She studied singing at the University of Cape Town and at the Juilliard School in New York. She was also taught by Johan Botha (tenor), Kiri Te Kanawa and Michelle Breedt.

Career as an opera singer 
From 2011 to 2013, she was a member of an opera studio and from 2014 to 2018, of the ensemble of the Bavarian State Opera. In addition, she had several roles at the Stadttheater Klagenfurt from 2013 to 2015 and appeared for the first time at the Salzburg Festival in 2015, where she gave the role of Sophie in Der Rosenkavalier.

In 2016, Schultz sang Susanna in The Marriage of Figaro at la Scala.
In 2017, she was again heard at the Salzburg Festival, this time as Vitellia in La clemenza di Tito. In October 2017, she made her debut at the Metropolitan Opera in New York City as Pamina in The Magic Flute.

Roles (selection) 
 Dido (Purcell: Dido and Aeneas)
 Contessa Almaviva (Mozart: Le nozze di Figaro)
 Donna Elvira (Mozart: Don Giovanni)
 Pamina (Mozart: Die Zauberflöte)
 Susanna (Mozart: Le nozze di Figaro)
 Ines (Verdi: Il trovatore)
 Anna (Verdi: Nabucco)
 Mrs. Alice Ford (Verdi: Falstaff)
 Liù (Puccini: Turandot)
 Sophie (Strauss: Der Rosenkavalier)
 Freia (Wagner: Das Rheingold)
 Ortlinde (Wagner: Die Walküre)
 Elisabeth Zimmer (Henze: Elegy for Young Lovers)
 Clara (Gershwin: Porgy and Bess)
 Agathe (von Weber: Der Freischütz)

References

External links 
 
 
 Golda Schultz Portrait in the Munich TZ, article from 15 February 2014, Retrieved 1 March 2021
 Golda Schultz on Operabase
 

South African operatic sopranos
Date of birth missing (living people)
Living people
1983 births
21st-century South African women opera singers